Tommy Taylor (1932–1958) was an English international footballer who played for Barnsley and Manchester United.

Tommy Taylor may also refer to:

Tommy Taylor (baseball) (1892–1956), Major League Baseball player
Tommy Taylor (footballer, born 1903) (1903–1978), English footballer who played for Southampton
Tommy Taylor (Irish footballer), Irish international footballer
Tommy Taylor (footballer, born 1951), English footballer who played for Leyton Orient and West Ham United
Tommy Taylor (New Zealand politician) (1862–1911), New Zealand politician
Tommy Taylor (Mississippi politician) (born 1948), American politician in the Mississippi House of Representatives
Tommy Taylor (rugby league) (1911–1992), English rugby league footballer
Tommy Taylor (rugby union) (born 1991), rugby union player
Tommy Taylor (athlete), British Paralympic gold medal winner
Tommy Taylor (wrestler) (born 1986), English wrestler
Tommy Taylor (musician) (born 1957), drummer 
Tommy Taylor (drummer) (born 1957), drummer 

J. Thomas Taylor (1889–1966), known as Tommy, American horse trainer

See also
Thomas Taylor (disambiguation)
Tom Taylor (disambiguation)